The 1954 All-Southwest Conference football team consists of American football players chosen by various organizations for All-Southwest Conference teams for the 1954 college football season.  The selectors for the 1954 season included the Associated Press (AP) and the United Press (UP).  Players selected as first-team players by both the AP and UP are designated in bold.

All Southwest selections

Backs
 Frank Eidom, SMU (AP-1 [HB]; UP-1)
 Dicky Moegle, Rice (AP-1 [HB]; UP-1) (College Football Hall of Fame)
 Henry Moore, Arkansas (AP-1 [FB]; UP-1)
 Billy Hooper, Baylor (AP-1 [QB])
 Elwood Kettler, Texas A&M (UP-1)

Ends
 Hank Gremminger, Baylor (AP-1; UP-1)
 Bennie Sinclair, Texas A&M (AP-1; UP-1)

Tackles
 Jim Ray Smith, Baylor (AP-1; UP-1) (College Football Hall of Fame)
 Buck Lansford, Texas (AP-1)
 Eddie Rayburn, Rice (UP-1)

Guards
 Bud Brooks, Arkansas (AP-1; UP-1)
 Kenny Paul, Rice (AP-1; UP-1)

Centers
 Hugh Pitts, TCU (AP-1; UP-1)

Key
AP = Associated Press

UP = United Press

Bold = Consensus first-team selection of both the AP and UP

See also
1954 College Football All-America Team

References

All-Southwest Conference
All-Southwest Conference football teams